In the mathematical area of braid theory, the Dehornoy order is a left-invariant total order on the braid group, found by Patrick Dehornoy.  Dehornoy's original discovery of the order on the braid group used huge cardinals, but there are now several more elementary constructions of it.

Definition
Suppose that  are the usual generators of the braid group  on  strings.

We have:

  

These properties imply that if we define  as  then we get a left-invariant total order on the braid group.

History 
Set theory introduces the hypothetical existence of various "hyper-infinity" notions such as large cardinals. In 1989, it was proved that one such notion, axiom , implies the existence of an algebraic structure called an acyclic shelf which in turn implies the decidability of the word problem for the left self-distributivity law  a property that is a priori unconnected with large cardinals.

In 1992, Dehornoy produced an example of an acyclic shelf by introducing a certain groupoid  that captures the geometrical aspects of the  law. Since the braid order appears precisely when the large cardinal assumption is eliminated, the link between the braid order and the acyclic shelf was only evident via the original problem from set theory.

Properties 
 The existence of the order shows that every braid group  is an orderable group and that, consequently, the algebras  and  have no zero-divisor.
 For , the Dehornoy order is neither Archimedean, nor Conradian: there exist braids  satisfying  for every  (for instance  and ), and braids  greater than  satisfying  for every  (for instance,  and ).
 As a binary relation, the Dehornoy order is decidable. The best decision algorithm is based on Dynnikov's tropical formulas, see Chapter XII of; the resulting algorithm admits a uniform complexity .

Connection with knot theory 
 Let  be Garside's fundamental half-turn braid. Here are some examples.
 If  then  is prime, non-split, and non-trivial.

References

Further reading 

Knot theory
Braid groups
Order theory